Justice Herbert Dharmarajah Thambiah (14 October 1926 – 4 October 1992) was a leading Sri Lankan lawyer and judge. He was a Court of Appeal judge, Supreme Court judge and the 39th Chief Justice of Sri Lanka.

Early life and family
Thambiah was born on 14 October 1926. He was the son of C. R. Thambiah, a lawyer from Jaffna in northern Ceylon. He was educated at Jaffna Central College and St. Thomas' College, Colombo. After school he entered University of Ceylon and graduated with an honours degree in economics. He taught at Hartley College for a period. He then entered Ceylon Law College, obtaining a first class in the final examinations. He became an advocate in 1954.

Thambiah married Ranji Appathuari. They had one daughter - Savithri.

Career
After qualifying Thambiah practised law for a while before joining the judicial service. He rose up the ranks and became a Court of Appeal judge in 1978 and Supreme Court judge in 1984. He was appointed Chief Justice in 1991. He was succeeded by G. P. S. de Silva.

Thambiah died on 4 October 1992 at the age of 65.

References

1926 births
1992 deaths
20th-century Sri Lankan lawyers
Alumni of Jaffna Central College
Alumni of S. Thomas' College, Mount Lavinia
Alumni of Sri Lanka Law College
Alumni of the University of Ceylon
Ceylonese advocates
Chief justices of Sri Lanka
Court of Appeal of Sri Lanka judges
Faculty of Hartley College
People from Northern Province, Sri Lanka
Sri Lankan Tamil judges
Sri Lankan Tamil lawyers
Sri Lankan Tamil teachers